Milford Mill refers to the following places in the suburbs of Baltimore, Maryland, in the United States:

Milford Mill, Maryland, a census-designated place in Baltimore County near Pikesville and Randallstown
Milford Mill Road, a major road in Baltimore County that runs from Pikesville to Milford Mill
Milford Mill station, a commuter rail station in the Sudbrook Park area of Pikesville, Maryland
Milford Mill Academy, a high school in the Milford Mill area

Other places
Milford Mills, Pennsylvania, a village in Chester County
Milford Mills, County Carlow, an 18th-century watermill in Milford, County Carlow, Ireland